Rebecca Night (born Rebecca Hardwick; 13 July 1985) is an English actress who starred in the title role of James Hawes's BBC Four adaptation Fanny Hill. Night and Stockard Channing co-starred as Jessie and Thelma in Marsha Norman's Pulitzer-Prize-winning play 'night, Mother at Hampstead Theatre.  On her performance, described by lead theatre critic Mark Shenton: "Night is like a young Julia Roberts... with natural stage chops... It turns out to be a riveting, revealing evening."

Background
Rebecca Night was born in Poole, Dorset. She attended Yarrells Preparatory School in Upton, Dorset where she took part in the annual musical productions, and later Parkstone Grammar School in Poole as well as Brownsea Open Air Theatre.
Night is a former member of the National Youth Theatre, where she appeared as Hero in Much Ado About Nothing and in Master & Margarita at the Lyric Hammersmith. She later trained at Rose Bruford College.

She is married to fellow actor Harry Hadden-Paton, whom she met while performing The Importance of Being Earnest. They have been married since 2010 and have two daughters together, Martha and Audrey.

Career
Night came to prominence playing the title role in Andrew Davies' BBC production of Fanny Hill.
Nancy Banks-Smith in The Guardian wrote, "Her freshness disinfects her story. It is a delightful debut."

She has since played a wide range of roles including Catherine Linton in ITV's Wuthering Heights, alongside Tom Hardy, Sarah Jones in the Mike Figgis film Suspension of Disbelief and Yvonne Moncin in Maigret, with Rowan Atkinson.

Theatre roles include Jessie in Marsha Norman’s Pulitzer-Prize-winning 'night, Mother alongside Stockard Channing as Thelma at the Hampstead Theatre, Queen Elizabeth in Oscar-winner David Seidler’s North American premiere of The King's Speech, Cecily Cardew in Peter Gill's The Importance of Being Earnest in London's West End and Rose of Sharon in Chichester Festival Theatre's Grapes of Wrath. She also created the role of Jack Cardiff’s carer Lucy alongside Tony-winner Robert Lindsay in Terry Johnson's Prism. Within the play, she transforms into both "a lustrous" (The Independent) Marilyn Monroe and Lauren Bacall.

Selected credits

Film
Mike Figgis' Suspension of Disbelief as Sarah
 Dartmoor Killing as Susan
Leopard as The Girl, directed by Eoin Macken

Television
 Fanny Hill as Fanny Hill
 "Maigret Sets a Trap", Maigret, as Yvonne Moncin
 Starlings as Bell
 Wuthering Heights as Catherine Linton
 Lark Rise to Candleford as Nan Carter
 Agatha Raisin with Ashley Jensen
 This September as Laura Aird
 The Sandman as Esme

Stage

 'night, Mother as Jessie - Hampstead Theatre, written by Marsha Norman
 The Importance of Being Earnest as Cecily – Benefit Gala Roundabout's American Airline's Theater, Broadway, NYC, written by Oscar Wilde
 The King's Speech as Queen Elizabeth – North American premiere at Chicago Shakespeare Theater, written by David Seidler
 Prism as Lucy/Marilyn Monroe/Betty Bacall – Hampstead Theatre, written by Terry Johnson
 The Meeting as Ellen – Hampstead Theatre
 Uncle Vanya as Yelena – St James Theatre
 Grapes of Wrath as Rose of Sharon – Chichester Festival Theatre
 Spoonface Steinberg as Spoonface Steinberg – Etcetera Theatre and King's Head Theatre
 The Importance of Being Earnest as Cecily Cardew  – Vaudeville Theatre and others
 Sweet Charity as Charity  – Rose Bruford Drama School at Battersea Arts Centre

Video games
 Mass Effect: Andromeda (2017) as Keri T'Vessa

TV adverts
 BT Infinity Broadband (2012) as Anna

References

External links

1985 births
Living people
Alumni of Rose Bruford College
English television actresses
English stage actresses
People from Poole
National Youth Theatre members